Under the Covers is the seventh studio album, and the first covers album recorded by Dwight Yoakam. It peaked at No. 8 on Billboard'''s Top Country Albums chart, and No. 92 on the Billboard 200.

Background
As he had on the commercially disappointing Gone two years before, Yoakam continued to challenge expectations with a mixed bag of covers, including songs by The Clash, The Kinks, The Beatles, and the Rolling Stones that betrayed the singer’s affection for British rock.   Two songs, "Here Comes the Night" and "Things We Said Today", were previously recorded for the 1992 compilation album La Croix d'Amour.  Various cuts, such as Roy Orbison’s "Claudette" and the Wynn Stewart hit "Playboy," fit him like a glove, with producer/guitarist Pete Anderson supplying arrangements that work to Yoakam’s strengths, but the Vegas lounge take of The Kinks' "Tired of Waiting for You" likely baffled listeners, with Yoakam biographer Don McCleese deeming it "a Rat Pack/Vegas miscalculation.  According to Anderson, Yoakam was inspired by Louis Prima on the number.  Yoakam also cut Sonny & Cher’s "Baby Don’t Go" as a duet with Sheryl Crow.  AllMusic’s Thom Jurek contends that track "doesn’t really work either, because Crow is not a country singer and there's enough countrypolitan in Yoakam's read that the two singers seem cold and at odds with each other."   Amazingly, considering how hot the radio-friendly Crow was in the Nineties, the single did not chart, although Yoakam’s reportedly sour relationship with his label Reprise may have been a factor in it not getting pushed.  ("Claudette," the LP’s first single, only made it to #47.)  Far more successful was the radically reworked "Train in Vain," originally recorded by The Clash but given full-on bluegrass treatment here with Ralph Stanley singing background vocals.

Reception
Writer Don McCleese deems the recording "strange, even by the standards set by Gone''."  AllMusic: "While this set is not perfect, it's still damn fine and warrants repeated listens to come to grips with Yoakam's visionary ambition."

Track listing
 "Claudette" (Roy Orbison) - 2:59
 "Train in Vain" (Mick Jones, Joe Strummer) - 3:23
 "Tired of Waiting for You" (Ray Davies) - 2:59
 "Good Time Charlie's Got the Blues" (Danny O'Keefe) - 3:17
 "Baby Don't Go" (Duet with Sheryl Crow) (Sonny Bono) - 4:01
 "Playboy" (Eddie Miller, Bob Morris) - 2:23
 "Wichita Lineman" (Jimmy Webb) - 2:54
 "Here Comes the Night" (Bert Berns) - 3:20
 "The Last Time" (Mick Jagger, Keith Richards) - 3:58
 "Things We Said Today" (John Lennon, Paul McCartney) - 3:51
 "North to Alaska" (Mike Phillips) - 9:13
 "T For Texas" (Jimmie Rodgers) (Hidden Track)

Personnel

 Dwight Yoakam – lead vocals, guitar, percussion
 Alex Acuña – percussion
 Beth Andersen – background vocals
 Pete Anderson – guitar, 6-string bass, mandolin, background vocals
 Tom Brumley – pedal steel guitar, lap steel guitar
 Jim Christie – drums
 Anthony Crawford – background vocals
 Sheryl Crow – duet, background vocals on "Baby Don't Go"
 Chuck Domanico – upright  bass
 Skip Edwards – piano, organ, accordion, keyboards
 Ralph Forbes – drum programming 
 Tommy Funderburk – background vocals
 Eric Jorgensen – trombone
 Scott Joss – fiddle, mandolin
 Nick Lane – trombone
 Lonesome Strangers – background vocals
 Dean Parks – guitar
 Lon Price – saxophone
 Taras Prodaniuk – bass, upright bass
 Jeff Rymes – background vocals
 Greg Smith – saxophone
 Ralph Stanley  – banjo, vocals
 Chris Tedesco – trumpet
 Lee Thornburg – trumpet
 Randy Weeks – background vocals

Chart performance

Album

Singles

References

Bibliography

1997 albums
Dwight Yoakam albums
Covers albums
Albums produced by Pete Anderson
Reprise Records albums